Kent County Council is a county council that governs most of the county of Kent in England. It is the upper tier of elected local government, below which are 12 district councils, and around 300 town and parish councils. The county council has 81 elected councillors. The chief executive and chief officers are responsible for the day-to-day running of the council. Roger Gough is the leader of the council as of October 2019. Kent County Council is currently controlled by the Conservative Party with 61 seats. The Labour Party have 7 seats. It is one of the largest local authorities in England in terms of population served and the largest local authority of its type.

In November 2022, the county council stated it, alongside Hampshire County Council, may face bankruptcy within 12 months due to austerity cuts.

Responsibilities
The council is responsible for public services such as education, transport, strategic planning, emergency services, social services, public safety and waste disposal.

Transportation

Kent Top Travel was owned by Kent County Council, and was established by them in 2005. It operated the council's bus network. It was argued that its existence stimulated competition. It also operated a coach charter fleet. The majority of Kent Top Travel's route portfolio comprised rural, evening and Sunday services won under competitive tender from Kent County Council and other local authorities in open competition with private bus operators. Kent Top Travel operated Canterbury City Council's park & ride service from October 2008 until 2013. Kent Top Travel operated both single and double deck buses as well as charter coaches. Buses were painted in a white and green livery, the Canterbury park & ride fleet silver and green. Coaches were painted both white & red, and yellow.

Following an independent report criticising Kent County Council's trading companies, in December 2012 it was decided to close Kent Top Travel once its existing contracts expired. Kent Top Travel ceased trading on 1 October 2013.

District councils

 Ashford Borough Council
 Canterbury City Council
 Dartford Borough Council
 Dover District Council
 Folkestone and Hythe District Council
 Gravesham Borough Council
 Maidstone Borough Council
 Sevenoaks District Council
 Swale Borough Council
 Thanet District Council
 Tonbridge and Malling Borough Council
 Tunbridge Wells Borough Council

Council structure
The Council is structured as follows:

County Council
The County Council is made up of 81 elected county councillors. The full council meets seven times a year to agree the council's Constitution and amendments to it, appoint the Leader, and approve the policy framework and budget (including the level of Council Tax).

Cabinet
The cabinet is made up of ten county councillors. The cabinet is responsible for the strategic thinking and decisions that steer how the council is run. The cabinet meets monthly and take decisions collectively.

Local Boards
Local boards are local community groups that hold regular public meetings across Kent so that the people of Kent to voice issues that affect their community. They also allocate funding to local projects. There are 12 local boards in Kent, and every county councillor is required to be a member of one local board.

The work of the Council is organized into directorates:
Strategic and Corporate Services 
supports the work of the directorates by providing specialist expertise and strategic direction. The department also leads and co-ordinates major change and organisational development.: It manages services that include Human Resources, Finance, Governance, Law and Democracy, Strategic Commissioning, Property and Infrastructure, Information Technology, Media and Communications, Consultation and Engagement, Customer Relations including Gateways and Contact Centre, Business Intelligence and Policy.
Children, Young People and Education 
It combines Education services with universal and targeted services for children and young people designed to reduce demand for specialist services, also provided in this directorate. By focusing on prevention and early intervention, their aim is to reduce demand in specialist children's social services by helping families earlier, improving parenting skills and the health and educational outcomes of young children, ensuring they are school ready. KCC will intervene earlier to support families in crisis through area based working and joined up teams providing a more seamless service and better working arrangements with partner organisations.: This encompasses the Kent Youth County Council which provides the young people of the county to have a voice on the issues that matter to young people aged 11–18.  Successes of the youth council include the introduction of the Kent Freedom Pass, which allows unlimited travel around Kent for a year at the cost of £100.  The Youth County Council holds its elections every November, and four young people from each of the 12 districts are elected to a two-year term.  The Kent Youth County Council is also affiliated with the UK Youth Parliament and British Youth Council.

Adult Social Care and Health 
works with people who need care and support, providing Adult Social Care Services and Public Health Services.
Growth, Environment and Transport 
This includes strategic responsibility for the future of the county in terms of planning, economic development, transport policy, and major transport improvement schemes, waste disposal and recycling services. In addition to a range of leisure and cultural facilities including the Turner Contemporary; country parks; libraries; and enforcement services including trading standards and community safety.

Elections and the democratic process

The most recent Kent County Council elections were held in 2021.

History
In 1889, the Local Government Act 1888 created an administrative county of Kent, with its own county council. The area of the administrative county was closely aligned with the area of the historic county. The main variations were that the northwestern extremities of the historic county came under the newly created administrative County of London, and Canterbury became a separate county borough with powers similar to that of a county. The county council's duties at first were few, but gradually it absorbed school boards, the rural highway boards and the boards of guardians. The county council adopted the Old Sessions House as its meeting place.

In 1965, the London Government Act 1963 abolished the existing county of London and replaced it with a new administrative county called Greater London. Greater London  covered even more of the northwestern of the historic Kent. In 1974, the Local Government Act 1972 abolished the previous structure of local government in England, except for Greater London. A new non-metropolitan county of Kent was created that was divided into districts, including a new City of Canterbury, which combined the former county borough with other areas to form a single district.

In 1998 the districts of Gillingham and Rochester-upon-Medway were removed from the control of the county council  to come under the control of a new unitary authority, Medway Council.

Joint arrangements with Medway
Kent County Council co-operates with the unitary Medway Council in many ways, for instance in the Kent and Medway Local Plan, and together they run joint agencies. Kent is combined with Medway for the purposes of representation in Parliament. The combined area elects 17 MPs, of whom 14 represent seats entirely within the Kent County Council area and another whose constituency is in both Kent and Medway.

Controversies

Section 28
The Conservative-run Kent County Council decided to ignore the government's decision to pass legislation to repeal Section 28 (An amendment to the Local Government Act 1988 that stated that a local authority "shall not intentionally promote homosexuality or publish material with the intention of promoting homosexuality" or "promote the teaching in any maintained school of the acceptability of homosexuality as a pretended family relationship") and create their own version to keep the effect of the now repealed law in their schools. This was replaced with provisions stating that heterosexual marriage and family relationships are the only firm foundations for society on 16 December 2004.

Credit crunch
Kent County Council is one of a number of authorities that invested in the Icelandic banks that have since been taken over by the Icelandic Government as result of the Icelandic financial crisis. KCC invested a total of £50m of taxpayers money that could be at risk.  A 2009 report by the Audit Commission claimed KCC was negligent by continued investment in Icelandic banks after being informed not to do so. KCC is now threatening the Audit Commission with legal action.

Investment in the tobacco industry
In August 2011 it was revealed that Kent Council had around £24m of its pension fund for employees invested in the tobacco industry.  The authority has about £13.5m in the Altria Group; £3.6m in Philip Morris; £3.5m in Imperial Tobacco and £3.4m in Japan Tobacco.

Pension fund
Its pension fund has been affected by issues arising at Woodford Investment Management's fund, as it has had about a £263m investment in one of their main equity vehicles. Due to the issues it has been working to withdraw its investment.

See also
 List of Members of Parliament in Kent
 White horse of Kent

Notes

References

External links
 Kent County Council

 
Local government in Kent
Politics of Kent
County councils of England
Local authorities in Kent
1889 establishments in England
Local education authorities in England
Major precepting authorities in England
Leader and cabinet executives